Camillus Perera (12 November 1937 – 15 July 2002) was a Sri Lankan cricket umpire. He stood in one Test match in 1986 and one ODI games in 1985.

See also
 List of Test cricket umpires
 List of One Day International cricket umpires

References

1937 births
2002 deaths
People from Sabaragamuwa Province
Sri Lankan Test cricket umpires
Sri Lankan One Day International cricket umpires